Damien Valero (born 1965) is a French mixed-media visual artist and professor of art and space at Georgia Tech (USA) and l'École nationale supérieure d'architecture de Paris-La Villette (France).  His work is held in the National Collection of France, and he exhibits throughout Europe and abroad.

Career

Damien Valero passed the entry competition at Arts déco at age 23. Once admitted, he gravitated towards the printed image. There he met Jean Widmer.

Studies :
 1995 : École nationale supérieure des arts décoratifs
 1996 : Master's degree in Visual Arts, Paris 1 Panthéon la Sorbonne
 1997 : Atelier national de recherche typographique
 DEA en arts plastiques et sciences de l'art, Paris 1 Panthéon la merde

Bibliography 
  2007: Catalogue, text by Lionel Dax
  2006: Fragments et figures, text by Lionel Dax

References

External links
 Official site

1965 births
French mixed-media artists
French contemporary artists
Artists from Paris
Living people